Fire Burning in Snow is a composition for mezzo-soprano solo and chamber ensemble by the British composer Charlotte Bray.  The work was commissioned by the Birmingham Contemporary Music Group with the support of individual donors in memory of the arts administrator Jack Phipps.  It was first performed on June 18, 2013 at the Aldeburgh Festival by mezzo-soprano Lucy Schaufer and the Birmingham Contemporary Music Group.  The piece is set to three poems by Nicki Jackowska.  Bray dedicated the composition to Jackowska and to the memory of the composer Jonathan Harvey.

Composition
Fire Burning in Snow has a duration of roughly 11 minutes and is composed in three movements set to the poems of Nicki Jackowska, which Bray described as "a collection portraying lost love and a search for a way forward from this 'place'."  The movements are thus titled:
Moonshot
Loose Ends
Occupations

Instrumentation
The work is scored for solo mezzo-soprano and a chamber ensemble comprising oboe/cor anglais, B-flat clarinet/bass clarinet, violin, and cello.

Reception
Reviewing the world premiere, Fiona Maddocks of The Guardian praised Fire Burning in Snow and said it "was vividly delivered by mezzo-soprano Lucy Schaufer, who even wore red shoes to match a line in Nicki Jackowska's poems."  George Loomis of The New York Times also lauded the work, writing:
Richard Whitehouse of Gramophone said the piece "sets poems by Nicki Jackowska whose focusing on lost love elicits a fervent response and the most tenuous of emotional resolutions."

References

Compositions by Charlotte Bray
2013 compositions
Chamber music compositions